Torre Titanium is a vertical condominium building for residential use. It is located on Av. Empresarios #236, Boulevard. Puerta de Hierro, Zapopan, in Mexico. It is the third highest building in the city after Torre Aura Altitude and Torre Aura Lofts. It will be the thirteenth highest in metropolitan Guadalajara in 2010. Its builder and realtor company is Grupo Imber.

Description
Its architectural theme is an innovation in Guadaljara, composed as it is of three triangles joined by a cylindrical insert, maximising the view and providing a solid structure. Steel, glass and concrete was used in its construction. There are three high speed elevators ( per second) and one service elevator. It also has five levels of underground spaces.

Relevant facts

Construction started in 2005 and ended in January 2008. Allocation of units began in October, 2007. As of August 2008, 95% of the apartments were sold; the building is 60% inhabited.

Each condominium has three parking slots, townhouses have four or five, the penthouse has six. There are 21 slots for visitors and eight for disabled people.

Headroom is, on average,  from floor to ceiling. It is regarded as an intelligent building—the lighting is controlled by a system called B3. This system is also installed in the Guggenheim Tower in Guadalajara, the Torrena, the Aura Tower Lofts and the Tower Aura Altitude.

The building is fitted out with an events hall, a lobby/reception area, a business center and a fitness center complete with spa, pool and dressing rooms. Security is active 24 hours a day.

External links 
 Official Home Page Torre Titanium
 Official Site Grupo Imber
 ffical Site de JEGAL
 

Residential buildings completed in 2008
Buildings and structures in Jalisco
Residential condominiums
Zapopan
Residential skyscrapers in Mexico
2008 establishments in Mexico